The Colony Assembly of British Columbia was formed in 1858 but there was no assembly till 1864. The assembly existed from January 21st 1864 to August 6th 1866 when the Colony of British Columbia merged with the Colony of Vancouver Island. Only a minority of the members of the Legislative Council were elected.

Governors of British Columbia
 Sir James Douglas, 1858-1864
 Frederick Seymour, 1864-1866

Members of the Legislative Assembly
Members 1863-1864

Members 1864-65

Members 1866

References

Pre-Confederation British Columbia
British Columbia
British North America
1858 establishments in British Columbia